The Thuta Swesone literary awards have been presented by the Swesone Media group since 2006.
They are sponsored by Tin Tun Oo, the cofounder of the Myanmar Times.
The awards complement the government's National Literary Awards and Sarpay Beikman Manuscript Awards and the Sayawun Tin Shwe Award, Pakokku U Ohn Pe literary award and Tun Foundation award.

Awards by year

2007 awards
The fourth awards, for the year 2007, were announced in February 2009.
A panel of eight judges from Swesone Media Group and from the Myanmar Writers and Journalists Association chose the winners.
The 79-year-old writer and historian Khin Maung Nyunt won the lifetime achievement prize.
Maung Tun Lwin (Meteorology) won the Science knowledge prize for The Girl Called La Niña and Articles about Natural Disasters.
Other awards for  books published in 2007 were won by
Maung Zayyar,
Hmu Thamein,
Kyaw Oo Hla, 
Chit Swe Myint,
Maung Hla Thaung,
Chit Naing (Psychology),
H E U Hla Maung (Eco) and
Aung (MC1).

2008 awards
The awards for the year 2008 were presented on 1 March 2010 at Traders Hotel in Yangon.
Minister for Information Brigadier-General Kyaw Hsan attended the prize presentation ceremony.
Winners were:

2009 awards
The sixth Thuta Swesone Literary Award, for Burmese books published in 2009, were announced on 20 April 2011. Winners were:

References

Burmese literary awards
Awards established in 2006
2006 in Myanmar